The 2001 World Weightlifting Championships were held in Antalya, Turkey from November 4 to November 11. The women's competition in 58 kg division was staged on 6 November 2001.

Medalists

Records

Results

References
Weightlifting World Championships Seniors Statistics, Page 32 

2001 World Weightlifting Championships
Women